Nothosaerva is a monotypic genus of flowering plants in the family Amaranthaceae containing the single species Nothosaerva brachiata. It is native to India, Sri Lanka, Southeast Asia, and eastern Africa.

This species was first described in 1852 with the name Pseudanthus. This turned out to be an illegitimate homonym, so it was renamed Nothosaerva in 1853.

References

Amaranthaceae
Amaranthaceae genera
Monotypic Caryophyllales genera